Mona Arshi is a British poet. She won the Forward Prize, Felix Dennis Prize for Best First Collection in 2015 for her work Small Hands.

Biography
Arshi was educated at Lampton Comprehensive School and grew up in an Indian Sikh family from Punjab in Hounslow. She studied at Guildford College of Law and University College London and the London School of Economics (LSE), where she obtained a master's degree in human rights law in 2002. She trained as a solicitor  in the civil liberties law firm JR Jones Solicitors in West London a firm that acted for Doreen and Neville Lawrence after their son Stephen Lawrence's murder in 1993. She worked for several years as a litigator at the NGO Liberty and while there she acted on many high-profile judicial review cases including Diane Pretty's "right to die" case, asylum destitution cases and death in custody cases.

Poetry 
Arshi began writing poetry in 2008 and then went on study creative writing (Poetry) at the University of East Anglia (MA Creative Writing, 2010), where she obtained a distinction. While she was studying for her masters she won first prize in the inaugural Magma poetry competition for her poem "Hummingbird". She then went on to become prize winner in the Troubadour International Competition in 2013 for her poem "Bad Day in the Office". In 2013 The Huffington post named her "In Five Poets to Watch". In 2014 she was joint winner in the Manchester creative writing competition with a portfolio of five poems.

In 2015 she published her debut collection of poems Small Hands with Pavilion Poetry, a new poetry press from the Liverpool University Press under the editorship of the poet and critic Deryn Rees Jones. The poet George Szirtes said of Small Hands: "It is rare to find a first book as beautiful as this", and the Times journalist and author Sathnam Sanghera praised Arshi as "Nothing less than Britain's most promising writer". Her poems "The Lion" and "Phone call on a train Journey" from Small Hands were published in The Guardian and the Sunday Times. Her poem "This Morning" appeared on posters across the London Underground, as part of the British Council's "Indian Poems on the Underground" project in 2017. Arshi went on to judge the Forward Prize for poetry in 2017 http://www.forwardartsfoundation.org and hosted the Awards with Andrew Marr at the Royal Festival Hall. Arshi has also judged the Magma Poetry Competition and the Outspoken Poetry Prize http://www.outspokenldn.com/tnc. She also judged the Manchester creative writing prize in 2017.

In 2017 BBC Radio 4 broadcast Arshi's commissioned poem "Odysseus,The Patron Saint of Foreigners?" In 2018 she was asked to read at the First Stuart Hall Public Conversation.

Arshi's  second book, Dear Big Gods, was published in April 2019, also by Pavilion Poetry. The title poem and an essay, "On Gods, Human Rights and the Poet", was published in the US magazine POETRY in 2019. In the essay Arshi comments: "A poem is not a human rights instrument or the pleadings in a court case, nor should it seek to be but one activity that the human rights lawyer and poet share is the restless interrogation of language....Poetry needs to continue to strive to make space for itself and think the unthinkable, the unimaginable on the page." Andrew Motion praised Arshi's second book as "Beautifully direct, and delivered a kind of instantaneousness that I admired a lot. The diction very clean, too, and the forms involving in their twists and turns".

Prose 
In 2021 Arshi published her debut novel Somebody Loves You', published by 'And other Stories.' It was prize listed for the Desmond Elliot Prize in 2022 as well as the Jhalak [[Jhalak Prize] ] and longlisted for the 2022 Republic of Consciousness Prize. In November 2022 Arshi's novel was shortlisted for the Goldsmiths Prize.'Somebody Loves You'  was also named book of the week in The Telegraph and This Week magazine.

 Works 
 Small Hands (poetry), 2015 (Liverpool University Press)
 Dear Big Gods (poetry), 2019 (Liverpool University Press)
 Somebody Loves You'' (short stories), 2021 (And Other Stories)

References

Living people
21st-century English poets
21st-century English women writers
Alumni of Birmingham City University
Alumni of the London School of Economics
Alumni of the University of East Anglia
Alumni of University College London
Year of birth missing (living people)
British writers of Indian descent